For lists of celebrations, please see:

 Lists of festivals
 List of holidays by country